Hendra Syahputra (born September 1, 1983) is an Indonesian footballer who currently plays for PSAP Sigli in the Indonesia Super League.

Club statistics

References

External links

1983 births
Association football defenders
Living people
Indonesian footballers
Liga 1 (Indonesia) players
PSAP Sigli players
Indonesian Premier Division players
Persiraja Banda Aceh players
PSSB Bireuen players